Karel Kroupa (born 27 April 1980) is a former Czech football player, who last played for Prostějov.

Career
In the 2009–2010 season, while playing for Tescoma Zlín, he scored 14 goals and became the best goalscorer of the Czech 2. Liga together with Pavel Černý and Dani Chigou. In June 2011, he joined Slovak club Senica on a one-year contract. On 13 January 2012, Kroupa signed for Slovak side FC Nitra on a two-year contract.

Personal life
Karel is the son of the famous Czechoslovak footballer Karel Kroupa.

References 

1980 births
Living people
Footballers from Brno
Czech footballers
Denizlispor footballers
Association football forwards
FC Zbrojovka Brno players
FK Teplice players
SK Kladno players
Expatriate footballers in Slovakia
Czech expatriate sportspeople in Slovakia
FC Fastav Zlín players
Expatriate footballers in Turkey
Czech expatriate sportspeople in Turkey
FK Senica players
FC Nitra players
Czech First League players
Slovak Super Liga players
Süper Lig players
Czech expatriate footballers
1. SK Prostějov players
Czech National Football League players
MFK Ružomberok players